A   (also spelled kero, quero, locally also qero) is an ancient Andean drinking vessel used to drink liquids like alcohol, or more specifically, chicha. They can be made from wood, ceramics, silver, or gold. They were traditionally used in Andean feasts.

 were decorated by first cutting a shallow pattern on the surface of the cup, then filling the pattern with a durable, waterproof mixture of plant resin and pigment such as cinnabar. The finely incised lines would meet at intersection points that collaborated to create shapes such as triangles, squares, and diamonds. The shapes are organized in two to four horizontal registers.

One is generally decorated with lavish, hand-painted, geometric designs that follow the traditional techniques in Písac ceramics. Others, however, may be painted with narrative scenes that could possibly be true historical events. Many times they are solitary, other times they are found together with other types of Peruvian pottery.  production reached its peak between 1000 and 1200 CE but continued after European contact.  are most commonly found in Moquegua, Peru. The Museo Contisuyo in Moquegua has  on display.

During Inca times, the vessels were typically made in identical pairs. This followed the custom that two individuals were required to drink together and both  in the pair would have identical size, shape, and decoration. These pairs were typically used for toasts in ceremonies and were also given along with textiles as gifts as a sign of Inca generosity.

Cultural Context
 production began in the Early Intermediate Period (100-600 CE), which was a time period that witnessed socio-political intensification and saw an increase in the amount of political elites throughout the Andes. This was only furthered by the ritualistic ceremonies of the time. The cultures of the Andes became intermixed through these ceremonies and they contributed to the further stratification of classes because of their emphasis on hierarchy and authority.  played a significant role in these ceremonies.

There is a strong religious connection with the kero as well. Chicha was known as an important ritual libation and offering in ancient Andean culture. Many depictions of the  show a maize plant emerging from the vessel. These renderings allude to ' use as a pan-Andean offering receptacle for blood to be poured on the ground to guarantee a successful farming season. The  used for this purpose are different in that they do not follow the same beaker form as traditional  and are metal instead of clay or wood.

References

Drinkware
Indigenous ceramics of the Americas
Indigenous topics of the Andes
Inca Empire
1st-millennium establishments in South America